John Stewart Teasdale (born 15 October 1962) is a Scottish footballer, who played in the Football League for Wolverhampton Wanderers, Walsall, Hereford United and Blackpool. A product of the Scottish Highland Football League, Teasdale commenced his senior professional football career with Nairn County FC, and finished his senior career with Elgin City FC, and Rothes FC, also both Highland Football League clubs at that time.

References

External links

1962 births
Living people
Association football forwards
Scottish footballers
Nairn County F.C. players
Wolverhampton Wanderers F.C. players
Walsall F.C. players
Hereford United F.C. players
Willenhall Town F.C. players
Blackpool F.C. players
Elgin City F.C. players
East Stirlingshire F.C. players
Rothes F.C. players
Scottish Football League players
English Football League players
Footballers from Glasgow
Highland Football League players